The Gower dialect refers to the older vocabulary or slang of the Gower Peninsula on the south Wales coast. It was Normanised/Anglicised relatively early after the Norman conquest of England. Relatively cut off from the Welsh hinterland, but with coastal links across south Wales and the West Country, the region developed their distinct English dialect which endured to within living memory.

History 
The Gower Peninsula was geographically insulated from 'mainland' modern language influences until well into the twentieth century. A number of words and pronunciations were recorded during the nineteenth and twentieth centuries as distinct usages in Gower — many of which might once have been widespread but which had fallen out of use in the developing standard English.

Some Gower words seem to derive from the Welsh language (e.g. pentan), but many more of the words and usages are cognate with English country dialects including those of South Devon, Somerset and Wiltshire.

Vocabulary 
 Angletouch - a worm
 Back - iron plate, part of a dredge
 Beader/bidder - person appointed to summon guests to a Gower wedding
 Bellamine - unglazed brown earthenware pitcher (cf Bellarmine)
 Bett - prepared turf used for hedging
 Blonkers - sparks
 Bossey - a calf still running with its mother
 Bubback - scarecrow; dull person
 Bumbagus - the bittern (cf Welsh aderyn y bwn)
 Butt - a small cart
 Caffle - tangle
 Carthen - winnowing sheet
 Casn't - cannot
 Cassaddle - harness piece for a draught horse
 Cavey - humble
 Charnel - box-like space above the fireplace, often used for hanging bacon
 Clavvy/ Clevvy - large oak beam supporting the inner wall of a chimney
 Clever - fine (adj)
 Cliffage - tithe on quarried limestone, payable to the Lord of the Manor
 Cloam - earthenware
 Cratch - haystack
 Culm - small coal used in lime-burning
 Cust - could
 Cuzzening - coaxing
 Dab - a large stone used in playing duckstone
 Deal - a litter (of pigs)
 Dobbin - large mug
 Dowset - Gower dish, similar to 'whitepot' (below)
 Drangway - narrow lane or alleyway
 Drashel - a flail
 Dree - three
 Dreppance - three pence
 Drow - throw
 Dryth - dryness
 Dumbledarry - cockchafer
 Evil - a three pronged dung-fork
 Frawst / froist - a dainty meal (n); frightened/astonished (adj)
 Gake - yawn
 Galeeny - guinea-fowl
 Gambo - a cart; wagon
 Glaster - buttermilk in the churn
 Gloice - a sharp pang of pain
 Gurgins - coarse flour
 Gwain - going
 Hambrack/hamrach - a straw horse-collar (cf 'rach')
 Herring-gutted - lean, skinny
 Holmes - holly
 Inklemaker - busy person
 Ipson - the quantity that can be held in a pair of cupped hands
 Ite - yet
 Jalap - liniment; laxative tonic
 Jorum - large helping of tea or beer
 Keek - to peep
 Keelage - foreshore berthing fee due to the Lord of the Manor
 Keeve - large barrel or vat
 Kerning - ripening; turning sour
 Kersey - cloth woven from fine wool
 Kittlebegs / kittybags - gaiters
 Kyling - sea fishing
 Lake - small stream or brook
 Lancher / Lansher - greensward between holdings in a common field or 'viel'
 Leery - empty
 Lello - a fool; a carefree lad
 Makth - makes
 Mapsant - local saint's feast day celebrations (from Welsh mab - son; sant (holy)
 Mawn - large wicker basket for animal feed
 Melted - broken up, disintegrated
 Mort - pigfat; lard
 Mucka - a rickyard
 Neargar, fargar - nearer, farther
 Nestletrip / nesseltrip - smallest pig in a litter
 Nice - fastidious
 Nipparty / Noppit - perky
 Nummit / Nommit - a simple lunch, e.g. of bread and 'soul', as might be sent to harvesters in the field (? 'noon meat'?)
 Oakey - greased
 Oakwib - cockchafer
 Owlers - wool smugglers
 Pentan - hob (from Welsh pen - head or top, tan - fire)
 Pill - stream
 Pilmy - dusty
 Planche - to make a board floor (cf French plancher - a wooden floor)
 Purty - to turn sulky
 Quapp - to throb
 Quat - to press or flatten
 Raal - real
 Rach - the last sheaf of corn to be harvested (see also 'hamrach')
 Reremouse - the bat (animal)
 Resiant - resident, particularly a person resident in the area but not having a feudal tenancy
 Riff - short wooden stick for sharpening a scythe
 Rining - mooching; scrounging
 Rying - fishing
 Scrabble - to gather up objects hastily
 Shoat - a small wheaten loaf
 Shrid - to trim a hedge
 Slade - land sloping towards the sea
 Soul - cheese or butter, as eaten with bread
 Spleet - (1) a knitting needle (2) a quarryman's bar
 Starved - perished with cold
 Stiping - hobbling a sheep by tying its head to its foreleg with a band of straw
 Tacker - a youngster
 Tite - to overturn
 Towser - a rough apron
 Uddent - wouldn't
 Umman - woman
 Vair - a stoat or weasel
 Vather - father
 Vella - fellow
 Viel/Vile - a field. The name is still used to describe a commonly managed field at Rhossili on Gower, which is farmed in a mediaeval strip field arrangement
 Vitte - clever or smart
 Vorrit - forehead
 V'rall - for all
 Vurriner - foreigner
 Want - a mole (animal)
 Weest - dismal
 Whirret - a slap
 Whitepot - a Gower delicacy of flour, milk & currants baked (cf Devon whitepot, a sort of bread-and-butter pudding)
 Wimbling - winnowing
 Witches - moths
 Yau - ewe
 Zig - urine
 Zive - scythe
 Zongals/songals - corn gleanings
 Zul/sul - a plough
 Zz'thee knaw - do you know

Use of the dialect in art

Cyril Gwynn was a Gower poet who used the Gower dialect in his poetry.

Phil Tanner was a Gower singer who used the Gower dialect in his songs, including the Gower Wassail.

Further reading 
 
 Tucker, Horatio. Gower Gleanings (Gower Society 1951) and miscellaneous articles in Gower, the journal of the Gower Society 
 Robert Penhallurick - Gowerland and its language (Peter Lang,1994)

References 

Dialects of English
Welsh English
Dialect